Guai ai vinti (Woe to the Vanquished Ones) is a 1954 Italian melodrama film directed by Raffaello Matarazzo. It is based on the novel  Vae Victis by Annie Vivanti.

Plot 
During the First World War the Italian front at Caporetto is overwhelmed by an attack of adverse troops. Luisa and her sister Clara remain in their villa, prisoners of the Austrians. They are forced to undergo all sorts of violence, so that Mirella, the little daughter of Luisa, lost the use of the word following the trauma.

Cast 
 Lea Padovani: Luisa
 Anna Maria Ferrero: Clara
 Pierre Cressoy: Franco
 Clelia Matania: Teresa
 Camillo Pilotto: Bonechi
 Gualtiero Tumiati: Don Marzi
 Rolf Tasna: Claudio
 Paola Quattrini: Mirella
 Giulio Ottavi: Giovanni
 Emilio Cigoli: Pietro
 Mario Del Monaco: Mario Abbate
 Marcella Rovena: Countess Amelia
 Isa Querio: Miss Bonechi
 Bianca Doria: Contadina nel granaio
 Teresa Franchini: Contadina nel granaio
 Anita Durante: Popolana
 Irene Cefaro: Friend of Clara
 Enrico Glori: Viaggiatore

References

External links

1954 films
1954 drama films
Italian drama films
Films directed by Raffaello Matarazzo
World War I films set on the Italian Front
Films scored by Renzo Rossellini
Italian black-and-white films
Melodrama films
1950s Italian films